The women's 100 metres event at the 2013 Summer Universiade was held on 7–8 July.

Medalists

Results

Heats
Qualification: First 3 in each heat and 6 best performers advance to the Semifinals.

Wind:Heat 1: +0.1 m/s, Heat 2: -0.3 m/s, Heat 3: +0.2 m/s, Heat 4: +0.5 m/s, Heat 5: 0.0 m/s, Heat 6: -0.3 m/s

Semifinals
Qualification: First 2 in each heat and 2 best performers advance to the Finals.

Wind:Heat 1: -0.9 m/s, Heat 2: -0.4 m/s, Heat 3: -0.2 m/s

Final
Wind: -0.2 m/s

References 

100
2013 in women's athletics
2013